Horrent is a French surname. Notable people with the surname:

Claire Horrent (1909–1998), French swimmer
Jules Horrent (1920–1981), Belgian scientist

French-language surnames